Thomas Odell Gilmore, Sr. (November 15, 1936 - September 24, 2019) was an American nurseryman and politician in the state of North Carolina. He was born in Julian, North Carolina.

A Democrat, he served in the North Carolina House of Representatives from 1972 to 1978 and later served as Deputy Secretary of Human Resources under Gov. Jim Hunt. He ran for Governor of North Carolina in 1984, for Congress in 1988, and for North Carolina Commissioner of Agriculture in 2004.

References

1936 births
2019 deaths
Democratic Party members of the North Carolina House of Representatives
People from Guilford County, North Carolina